Castle Point is a census-designated place (CDP) in St. Louis County, Missouri, United States. The population was 3,962 at the 2010 census.

Geography
Castle Point is located at  (38.755950, -90.248210).

Demographics

2010 census
As of the 2010 census, Castle Point had a population of 3,962.  The ethnic makeup of the population was 92.9% non-Hispanic African-American, 4.7% non-Hispanic white, 0.1% Native American, 0.3% Asian, 1.6% from two or more races and 0.6% Hispanic or Latino.

2000 census
At the 2000 census there were 4,559 people, 1,408 households, and 1,163 families in the CDP. The racial makeup of the CDP was 9.54% White, 88.66% African American, 0.31% Native American, 0.04% Asian, 0.04% from other races, and 1.40% from two or more races. Hispanic or Latino of any race were 0.42%.

Of the 1,408 households 44.4% had children under the age of 18 living with them, 36.7% were married couples living together, 40.0% had a female householder with no husband present, and 17.4% were non-families. 14.8% of households were one person and 3.7% were one person aged 65 or older. The average household size was 3.24 and the average family size was 3.55.

The age distribution was 37.6% under the age of 18, 9.6% from 18 to 24, 25.9% from 25 to 44, 20.7% from 45 to 64, and 6.3% 65 or older. The median age was 27 years. For every 100 females, there were 85.0 males. For every 100 females age 18 and over, there were 75.8 males.

The median household income was $31,081 and the median family income  was $33,281. Males had a median income of $29,919 versus $21,113 for females. The per capita income for the CDP was $11,386. About 22.6% of families and 24.6% of the population were below the poverty line, including 36.4% of those under age 18 and 18.3% of those age 65 or over.

References

Census-designated places in St. Louis County, Missouri
Census-designated places in Missouri